Erin Foster and Jeremy Bechtel were two American teenagers from Sparta, Tennessee, who disappeared in April 2000. Their bodies were found in Foster's vehicle in 2021 by Jeremy Sides, a volunteer civilian cold-case investigator and YouTuber.

Disappearance 
Erin Foster and Jeremy Bechtel were residents of Sparta, Tennessee. Bechtel spoke to his father Ronnie Bechtel by telephone on the evening of April 3, 2000. Foster was seen by her brother Will the same evening.

Foster and Bechtel attended a party that night but returned to Foster's parents' home before leaving again. Both teenagers were probably last seen around 10:00 p.m. in Foster's black Pontiac Grand Am. Foster was 18 at the time of her disappearance, while Bechtel was 17.

Searches 
No one saw them alive after the evening of April 3, 2000, prompting rumors and speculation of their whereabouts including false reports of sightings. Searches were undertaken locally, and also in Pensacola, Florida, during 2005 and 2006 following reports that Foster was living and working there.

Discovery 
On November 24, 2021, scuba diver Jeremy Sides searched a lake near the location of the party attended by the teenagers. Sides found a submerged vehicle, but it was not Foster's Grand Am. On November 30, using sonar technology, Sides found a vehicle located thirteen feet below the surface of the Calfkiller River, next to Highway 84, before running out of daylight. The following day, on December 1, 2021, Sides returned to the vehicle he had seen in the river and went diving to film the car. The license plate was confirmed to be that of Foster's Grand Am. He called White County Sheriff Steve Page to report his discovery and to confirm that it was Foster's car with two human remains found inside. The remains were later confirmed to be Foster and Bechtel, found in the vehicle after missing for 21 years.

Police have theorized that Foster lost control of her vehicle while driving on Highway 84, which did not have a guardrail along that section in 2000. As of July 2022, the police investigation was not closed, but foul play was ruled out from police lines of inquiry.

Jeremy Sides 

Jeremy Sides, from Acworth, Georgia, broadcasts his efforts to solve missing people cold cases on a YouTube channel.

Burial 
Both Foster and Bechtel were buried in 2022.

See also
List of solved missing person cases
List of unsolved deaths

References

External links 
 COLD CASE: Searching Lake For Two Teenagers That Vanished 20 Years Ago!, Exploring with Nug, YouTube, Nov 24 2021.
 SOLVED 21 Year Old Missing Persons Case (Erin Foster & Jeremy Bechtel) Exploring with Nug, YouTube, Dec 4 2021.

2000s missing person cases
April 2000 events in the United States
Couples
Foster, Erin
Formerly missing people
Missing American children
Missing person cases in Tennessee
Foster, Erin